The 1990 San Diego Padres season was the 22nd season in franchise history.  The team finished with a 75–87 record. They scored 673 runs and allowed 673 runs for a run differential of zero.

Offseason
 November 16, 1989: Don Schulze was released by the Padres.
 December 6, 1989: Fred Lynn was signed as a free agent by the Padres.
 December 6, 1989: Sandy Alomar Jr., Carlos Baerga and Chris James were traded by the Padres to the Cleveland Indians for Joe Carter.
 December 12, 1989: Craig Lefferts was signed by the Padres as a free agent.
January 11, 1990: Ronn Reynolds was signed as a free agent with the San Diego Padres.
 February 27, 1990: Omar Olivares was traded by the Padres to the St. Louis Cardinals for Alex Cole and Steve Peters.

Regular season

 Joe Carter set a club record for most RBIs in a season.
 July 12, 1990: Jack McKeon, holding the dual positions of general manager and field manager of the Padres, turns over the managing portfolio to one of his coaches, Greg Riddoch, during the All-Star break.  The Padres are 37–43 (.463) and in fourth place in the NL West at the time of McKeon's resignation.
 July 25, 1990: Roseanne Barr performed a controversial rendition of the "Star Spangled Banner" before a game against the Cincinnati Reds. As she later reported, she was initially having trouble hearing herself over the public-address system, so she was singing as loudly as possible, and her rendition of the song sounded "screechy". Following her rendition, she mimicked the often-seen actions of players by spitting and grabbing her crotch as if adjusting a protective cup. Barr claimed she had been encouraged by baseball officials to "bring humor to the song". The song and the closing routine offended many in the audience, and it was replayed frequently on television, drawing further attention to it.
 September 23, 1990: Ten weeks after stepping down as field manager, McKeon is fired from his general manager position by the Padres' new ownership group. He had led the San Diego front office since July 1980 and had acquired many of the players who led the team to its 1984 National League pennant. He is replaced by New York Mets executive Joe McIlvaine.

Opening Day starters
 Roberto Alomar
 Joe Carter
 Jack Clark
 Tony Gwynn
 Fred Lynn
 Bip Roberts
 Benito Santiago
 Eric Show
 Garry Templeton

Season standings

Record vs. opponents

Notable transactions
 June 4, 1990: 1990 Major League Baseball draft
Robbie Beckett was drafted by the Padres in the 1st round.
Alan Benes was drafted by the Padres in the 49th round, but did not sign.
 July 11, 1990: Alex Cole was traded by the Padres to the Cleveland Indians for Tom Lampkin.
 July 12, 1990: Mark Grant was traded by the Padres to the Atlanta Braves for Derek Lilliquist.
 August 24, 1990: Atlee Hammaker was signed as a free agent by the Padres.

Roster

Player stats

Batting

Starters by position
Note: Pos = Position; G = Games played; AB = At bats; H = Hits; Avg. = Batting average; HR = Home runs; RBI = Runs batted in

Other batters
Note: G = Games played; AB = At bats; H = Hits; Avg. = Batting average; HR = Home runs; RBI = Runs batted in

Pitching

Starting pitchers
Note: G = Games pitched; IP = Innings pitched; W = Wins; L = Losses; ERA = Earned run average; SO = Strikeouts

Other pitchers
Note: G = Games pitched; IP = Innings pitched; W = Wins; L = Losses; ERA = Earned run average; SO = Strikeouts

Relief pitchers
Note: G = Games pitched; IP = Innings pitched; W = Wins; L = Losses; SV = Saves; ERA = Earned run average; SO = Strikeouts

Award winners
 Joe Carter, National League Leader in At-Bats (634)
 Jack Clark, National League Leader Walks (104)
 Bruce Hurst, National League Leader Shutouts (4)
1990 Major League Baseball All-Star Game

Farm system

LEAGUE CHAMPIONS: Spokane

References

External links
 1990 San Diego Padres at Baseball Reference
 1990 San Diego Padres at Baseball Almanac

San Diego Padres seasons
San Diego Padres season
San Diego Padres